Jill Carter is an American politician and activist serving as a member of the Missouri Senate for the 32nd district. Elected in November 2022, she assumed office on January 4, 2023.

Education 
Carter graduated from East Newton High School in Granby, Missouri, and Crowder College.

Career 
Outside of politics, Carter operates her family's farm. She is also an anti-abortion and gun rights activist. Carter was elected to the Missouri Senate in November 2022 and assumed office on January 4, 2023. After taking office, Carter proposed legislation that would allow school districts to opt out of Missouri's accreditation program.

References 

Living people
Missouri Republicans
Missouri state senators
Women state legislators in Missouri
Crowder College alumni
People from Newton County, Missouri
Year of birth missing (living people)